Erotic humiliation is consensual psychological humiliation performed in order to produce erotic excitement or sexual arousal. This can be for either the person(s) being humiliated and demeaned or the person(s) humiliating, or both. It is sometimes performed before spectators, including through pornography and webcam modeling. It may be part of BDSM and other sexual roleplay, or accompanied by the sexual stimulation of the genitals (or other erotic region) of one or both parties in the activity.

Humiliation is a subjective issue and is dependent on context. It does not need to be sexual in nature; as with many other sexual activities, it is the feelings that are obtained from the experience that are desired, regardless of the nature of the actual activity. Usually there is a feeling of submission for the person being humiliated and dominance for the person implementing the humiliation. In another sense, the dominating person's words and actions are limited by the terms previously set by the submissive, so the submissive is actually controlling the interaction.

Erotic humiliation can be done verbally, physically, or both, and can be either private or public. Some individuals assume an acting role and others prefer to be spoken to in a degrading way. A classic technique that can be used to put the submissive into a bottom mind space is to humiliate them while also providing them with sexual stimulation. Select individuals who desire this form of humiliation also use it to acquire emotional release. Humiliation can become ritualized, and unlike some sexual variations, it can also be easily carried out over a long distance (such as online).

While fantasy and fascination with erotic humiliation is a prevalent part of BDSM and other sexual roleplay, relatively little has been written on it. Humiliation play can, however, be taken to a point where it becomes emotionally or psychologically distressing to one or the other partner, especially if it is public humiliation. Erotic humiliation can become extreme enough to be considered a form of edgeplay, which some consider may best be approached with advance negotiation and use of a safeword.

Terminology and overview

The most common name for the individual being humiliated is the bottom, and the opposite individual who humiliates the bottom is often called the top. However, these terms are standard ones that are used in general dominant/submissive roleplay and are not specific to humiliation interests.

 If the top is regarded as a female, they are sometimes called the humiliatrix. Other common names include Master/Dom (male top), and Mistress/Domme (female top). 
 For the bottom (irrespective of gender), other common names are  slave and sub/submissive.

While elements of erotic humiliation may be part of a number of domination and submission-based activities, humiliation is not the same as submission. The recipient does not necessarily seek to be ordered about. Humiliation comes into its own as a sexual force when the recipient seeks the humiliation over and above means. For example, being spanked is primarily valued because of the belittlement involved. Humiliation therefore encompasses a range of paraphilia, including foot fetish, breast fetish, shoe fetish, body worship, spanking, cum shots, peotomy, bondage, and most BDSM styles. It can be as basic as the desire to kiss and massage feet as a precursor to sex; and it can be complex, involving roleplay and public displays of subservience. It can also be for a set period of time (a "scene") or an ongoing facet of a relationship. The humiliation is not intrinsic to the act or the object. Rather, it is semiotically charged by the shared attitude of the partners engaged in the act. They invest specific acts, objects, or body parts with a humiliating aspect.

Means of humiliation

Many scenarios may give rise to sexual humiliation. Some scenarios may be based on verbal abuse and others on physical aspects.

Verbal humiliation
 Animal play, referring to the recipient as a pet (dog, bitch, et al.); making the humiliated one eat and drink from pet food and water bowls.
 Objectification, referring to the recipient as it, or as an object, a thing or a hole.
 Verbal belittlement, with such words as  boy, girl, missy, and pet.
 Insults and verbal abuse, such as loser, fat, ugly, pig, stupid, sick, disgusting, and worthless.
 Degrading names, such as slut, shit, bitch, cunt, and whore.
 Disparaging or cruel references about breasts, facial appearance, genitalia (including small penis size, erection difficulties, or circumcision status), buttocks, or about behaviors such as walking, responsiveness, and hygiene.
 Requirement to ask permission for everyday activities, such as going to the toilet, spending money, and eating.
 In feederism the dominant partner may humiliate the other by pointing out their weight or calling them names like piggy or fatty. They also might make fun of the other and their self-control, or poke and grope their flesh. The feedee may be required to consume on camera food that will lead to weight gain.
 Forced repetition, such as the humiliated one being obliged to repeat commands that he or she has been given and to confirm them.
 Forced flattery, such as agreeing that every decision that the dominant makes is wise, correct, and justifiable, while additionally praising the dominant's physical and personality traits.
 Mockery, derision, and ridicule.
 Scolding of the type commonly reserved for children.

Physical humiliation
Ejaculating, spitting, and urinating on the submissive's body, especially on the face (facial).
 "Forced" anal penetration, with dildos, anal plugs, and similar objects.
 Servitude
 "Forced" sexual degradation, including such acts as cunnilingus, analingus, and fellatio.
 Detailed accountability and control (micro-management) as to time spent and activities done, including lists of jobs to do, precise directions as to how the job is to be performed, and exactly how to act and behave.
 Real humiliation is the act of making a person carry out specific tasks which involve other real people who are not aware that there is a task or dominant relation issuing the task in the background.
 Specific rituals and affectations to be adopted. This includes displays of subservience, such as lighting cigarettes, walking a pace behind the dominant, speaking only when spoken to, eye contact rules, kneeling or prostrating oneself in front of the dominant when expecting orders, eating only after others or on the floor, and low-status place to sleep.
 Body worship, including such activities as kissing or licking the dominant's feet, boots, buttocks, anus, vulva, etc. to express acknowledgment, subservience, shame, and even positive emotions (such as happiness and excitement).
 Deprivation of privacy, which may include the submissive's never being able to leave the room in which the dominant is present without permission.
 The dominant watches while the submissive uses the toilet.
 The submissive's being forbidden to leave the house or 'dungeon' in general for the duration of slavery or servitude, etc.
 Discipline (BDSM), including erotic spanking, slapping, whipping, restraint, and other BDSM activities (such as cock and ball torture).
 Dresscode (BDSM): prescriptions and proscriptions of clothing, even in public.
 For women, a common example is being mandated to wear only bikinis or lingerie.
 For men, forced feminizing and cross-dressing.
For men, the wearing of a chastity cage.
 Both men and women may be expected to go completely naked, with decorative objects such as collars, diapers, bands, tiaras, and cuffs as the only exceptions.
 Erotic sexual denial, including the use of a chastity device.
 Wearing of external signs of "ownership", such as collars.
 Public humiliation, in which the submissive's friends or family, or strangers, are aware of or even witness the treatment.
 Erotic objectification, in which the submissive is used as human furniture, such as a footstool.
 Embarrassment
 Facesitting
 Cuckolding, a mostly heterosexual fetish in which the dominant woman has sex with a man outside of the relationship, called a "bull", sometimes in the presence of the submissive man, who sometimes is allowed to masturbate while watching. If the man is not present, he might help her choose what clothes to wear when she meets the other man, or they might get together afterward so she can tell him about it, either while having sex or in addition to withholding sex. If the wife and husband are not together, the wife can call the husband by telephone, or use a video service like FaceTime, so the husband can witness what happens to his wife and how much she enjoys it. He may be expected to consume the bull's semen from his wife's vagina, or out of a condom. Some husbands film their wives' cuckolding, and help set it up; sale of these videos is the couple's livelihood. Sex between the couple may follow. In recent years there has appeared a reverse form of cuckolding, called cuckqueening (sometimes spelled cuckqueaning), in which the wife must witness and sometimes assist in her husband's sexual activity with another female. In some cases these threeways become long-term relationships. Another variant of the cuckolding fetish is that a heterosexual couple fantasizes that another man will impregnate the woman.
 The submissive's having to ask permission to orgasm during sex or masturbation.
 The submissive's being forced to wear a gag or restraints on the body.
 Forced masturbation in a humiliating manner.
 Enemas cause feelings of humiliation which are key to many of those engaged in klismaphilia, and watching the consequent defecation can amplify that humiliation.
 Candaulism.

Some sexual humiliation involves physical inflicting pain, but much of it is far more concerned with ridicule, mocking, degradation, and embarrassment.

Sexual roleplaying can involve humiliation. For example, one person might play the part of a dog because they enjoy being mock-forced into it, and the top might emphasize the lowness of the bottom's status as an animal, whereas another person might play the role of the dog without any element of humiliation, simply as an expression of an inner animal or playful spirit.

Psychology of humiliation

Humiliation in general stimulates the same brain regions that are associated with physical pain, the inference being that humans evolved to remember social rewards and punishments as strongly as they recall physical reward or pain in response to their environment. As with any form of pain experimentation in a sexual context, consent and (paradoxically) a high degree of awareness and communication are needed to ensure that the result is desirable, rather than abusive. For example, a submissive may enjoy being insulted in some ways but would be genuinely crushed and devastated if humiliated or insulted in other ways.

Humiliation play is also connected to sexual fetishism, in that non-sexual activities may become sexualised by association with arousal, and also may be associated with exhibitionism in the sense of wanting others to witness (or being aroused by others witnessing) one's sexual degradation.

For some people, activities such as name-calling are a way of achieving ego reduction or getting over sexual inhibitions. For example, between gay people, terms usually associated with homophobia may be used, such as faggot and dyke.

As with all sexual activities, some people have sexual fantasies about humiliation, and others actually undertake it as a lifestyle or in a scene. Sexual fantasies relating to mild humiliation are common. Some humiliation roleplay (pup-play and age play in particular) is combined with loyalty and care-giving to the extent that these fetishes can be seen as exercises in trust rather than primarily a humiliation fetish. The desire to be beneath the other partner during intercourse, the idea of "getting caught" (as in having sex in the garden or woods), and simulated rape are emotional games that emphasise status, vulnerability, and control. However, for most people such ideas remain fantasies; the people would have strong reservations about the fantasies' being made public, or engaged in with a partner in real life, however erotic the idea may be.  When someone reveals a fetish to a partner, this usually is a result of great trust. However, the desire to be humiliated may be a motivating cause for confession, in that the act of confessing can itself be humiliating. Many people worry about being ridiculed for their fetishes, and such ridicule from their partners could be psychologically catastrophic. Therefore, many people use online humiliation (in which the humiliator and others are involved via the Internet, using chat, e-mail, websites, etc.) as a compromise between exhibitionism and reality on the one hand, and safety and anonymity on the other.

Online humiliation

Online humiliation occurs when an individual is seen in a sexually embarrassing context on the Internet. This practice allows the submissive to seek fetish partners from across the world. As the Internet has grown and continues to grow, so does online humiliation. Anecdotal reports indicate that the proportion of men being dominated by women on the Internet, through some type of personal service provided for a fee by the woman, vastly exceeds the instances of a woman being dominated online by a man, or another woman.

Common methods of online humiliation:

 Embarrassing photographic or video assignments for submissives, who must publicly post pictures or videos of their humiliation. The dominant may require public acts or exposure. Sometimes humiliating words are written on the submissive's body before photographing.
 Requiring the submissive to post publicly their name, address, phone number, employer, or other personal information.
 The requirement for submissives to keep online journals detailing personal information, such as masturbation frequency, thoughts or fantasies, technique or aid(s) used, and disposal of semen (if the submissive is allowed to masturbate).
 The requirement for the submissive to place themselves in chastity, and to publicly post a picture showing their status.
 Verbal abuse.
 Publicly bidding for items that reveal their fetishes.
 Money slavery, in which the submissive must buy the dominant gifts and pay the dominant's bills and taxes, or give the dominant direct access to their bank accounts and credit cards.
 Homework slavery, in which the submissive must do the dominant's homework or occupational work.
 Repetitive assignments, such as copying the phone book.
 Humiliating the submissive by changing information on social sites.
 Controlling the submissive's computer remotely, through remote desktop software the submissive is required to install.

These practices can be conducted through chat, webcam, e-mail, BDSM contact websites, and proprietary virtual spaces such as Second Life or FetLife.

See also

 Dominance and submission
 Edgeplay
 Erotic hypnosis
 Erotic sexual denial
 Financial domination
 Furry fandom
 Humiliation
 Index of BDSM articles
 Salirophilia
 Sexual fetishism

References

Notes

 

BDSM terminology
Sexual acts
Sexology